Leadville National Fish Hatchery established in 1889 west of Leadville, Colorado is one of 70 hatcheries in the National Fish Hatchery System.  It is managed by the United States Fish and Wildlife Service. It lies within the Mount Massive Wilderness, most of whose area lies within San Isabel National Forest and which is managed by the United States Forest Service.

Leadville National Fish Hatchery was listed on the National Register of Historic Places in 1980.

See also
National Register of Historic Places listings in Lake County, Colorado

References

External links

National Fish Hatcheries of the United States
Buildings and structures in Lake County, Colorado
Government buildings on the National Register of Historic Places in Colorado
Government buildings completed in 1890
Tourist attractions in Lake County, Colorado
National Register of Historic Places in Lake County, Colorado
Agricultural buildings and structures in Colorado
1890 establishments in Colorado